Game Retail Limited (doing business as GAME) is a British video game retailer, owned by Frasers Group since June 2019.

The company's origins lie in the founding of the Rhino Group by Terry Norris and Bev Ripley in 1992. A number of mergers and acquisitions followed during the 1990s, and in 1999, the company was purchased by Electronics Boutique Limited, which rebranded itself as The Game Group. The company continued to expand during the 2000s, purchasing several retailers including Gameswizards in Australia. In 2007, its parent company purchased its rival store, Gamestation.

In March 2012, several suppliers, including publishers Nintendo, Electronic Arts and Capcom refused to supply their latest products due to concerns over Game's creditworthiness. Game subsequently entered administration on 26 March 2012, and was purchased by OpCapita the following week. Baker Acquisitions was subsequently renamed Game Retail. The company reported a £10.4 million loss for the 12-month period from July 2016 to July 2017 in its full year results. In the corresponding 2015–2016 period, the company had a net profit of £7.1 million.

In June 2019, Game agreed to a takeover of the company by Frasers Group for £52 million. The group have since closed down some standalone Game outlets, reopening these as concessions inside nearby House of Fraser and Sports Direct stores, as well as expanding Game's online business.

History

Formation
The company that went on to become Game was founded by Bev Ripley and Terry Norris as Rhino Group in 1992, with stores branded as Future Zone. A year earlier in 1990, a separate company, called Game, was founded by Peter Wickins and Neil Taylor. Rhino Group acquired Virgin Games Stores from W H Smith in November 1993, increasing the total number of stores to 77.

In October 1995, the gaming retailer Electronics Boutique acquired 25% of the Rhino Group, the name of which was changed to Electronics Boutique Limited under license from the business in America, and John Steinbrecher was sent from the United States to manage the chain.

In November 1999, Electronics Boutique Limited purchased a chain of retail outlets known as Game, from which the current name of the company was derived, for £99 million. at the time of the takeover Game had 86 stores. In October 2001, Electronics Boutique Limited went on to purchase the BarrysWorld online gaming service, the French retailer ScoreGames, and the Spanish retailer Centro Mail.

In 2002, Electronics Boutique stores in the United Kingdom and Ireland were rebranded as Game, and the company name was changed to The Game Group. Despite the name change, a 1% sales royalty to Electronics Boutique in the United States continued to be paid until January 2006. Attempts to have this overturned in court in February 2003 were unsuccessful.

In July 2004, the Game group acquired Gameplay (GB) Limited, an online and mail order retailer of video games, computer software and associated products. Gameplay (GB) Ltd started trading as Game.co.uk, the group's main online arm in the United Kingdom.

In September 2006, Game acquired Australian speciality video games retailer Gameswizards for A$3.8 million and rebranded all Gameswizards outlets as Game stores.

In May 2007, the company announced the acquisition of rival specialist video game chain Gamestation for £74 million. The company stated that they intended to retain the brand. On 21 April 2010, Lisa Morgan stepped down as CEO, to be replaced by Chris Bell as interim CEO. On 17 June 2010, it was announced that Ian Shepherd had been appointed as CEO, and took up the position on 28 June.

Financial problems
On 29 February 2012 it was announced that both Game and Gamestation would no longer stock new titles from Electronic Arts. This was due to the major games distributor limiting Game's credit terms. This affected the pre-orders of Mass Effect 3, due out the following week. On 5 March 2012 it was announced that Game and Gamestation stores would not be stocking titles by Capcom. The first title affected by the move was Street Fighter X Tekken. Customers who pre-ordered the special edition from either store were refunded.

In early March 2012, Game and Gamestation began heavily discounting stock in an attempt to bring in cash ahead of administration.

On 14 March 2012, OpCapita made an unsuccessful bid for the company. The business had been in talks with Game's lenders with the aim of buying its debt and settling its bills with suppliers in full. The offer was rejected by Game's lenders. Microsoft and Activision ceased the supply of their products to Game on 15 March. On 19 March, the company's shares were suspended from the London Stock Exchange at its own request.

Administration

The company entered administration on 26 March 2012, with PricewaterhouseCoopers appointed and Ian Shepherd stepping down as CEO. No administrator was appointed for the stores in Ireland and redundancies were only offered to staff in the United Kingdom, resulting in a continuing protest from Irish staff. 277 of Game's 609 stores in the United Kingdom were closed immediately, resulting in 2,104 job losses.

On 31 March 2012, Game Group was purchased out of administration by OpCapita. David Hamid was announced as the new executive chairman of Game.

On 14 May 2012, TGW Pty Ltd, trading as Game Australia announced it would also enter administration. On 25 May 2012, Pricewaterhouse Coopers, the administrators of Game Australia made 264 staff redundant and closed 60 stores. An expected further round of redundancies and closures was confirmed on 19 June 2012 when the administrators announced that 16 of the remaining 31 stores would close that day and the remaining 15 would close over the coming weeks, marking the end of Game Australia.

Game's Scandinavian operations were purchased by Nordic Games (parent company of Nordic Games Publishing AB) at the end of May 2012. Nordic Games purchased 55 stores (44 in Sweden and 11 in Norway) and Game's Scandinavian website from the retailer. Nordic and Game agreed a licensing deal that allowed the continued use of the Game brand within Sweden and Norway. In May 2015 the Swedish subsidiary went into administration. During this time Nordic decided to reshuffle the company with no effect as the Swedish subsidiary of the company went into liquidation by June 2015, as a result of this Nordic had to sell all of their stock as soon as possible at half the retail price they were originally listed as. All  Swedish and Norwegian locations shut down in the summer of 2015.

Public listing
In May 2014, the company announced plans to relist on the London Stock Exchange. The initial public offering took place in June 2014.

In June 2019, Game Digital agreed to a takeover of the company by Fraser's Group for £52 million.

Operations
As of 2 April 2013, Game has 328 stores in the United Kingdom. Stores traded under the Game and Gamestation brands until the latter was replaced by Game from November 2012. Stores sell games for all major video game platforms. Games are also sold under a 'preowned' label, where a customer has returned a used game for cash or credit. The company also operates a transactional website, Game.co.uk.

Insomnia Gaming Festival

Insomnia Gaming Festival is a large-scale gaming event ran by Game sub-brand Player1 Events, with a professional Main Stage, an Expo Hall and a large-scale LAN (Local Area Network) event which is the largest LAN in the UK. Originally this was a PC gaming only event, but in recent years has incorporated console gamers. The series of events, referred to as the ‘iSeries’  are sequentially numbered and run three times a year, typically with one around Easter, with the others usually hosted in August and November. The original events were hosted at Newbury Racecourse in the United Kingdom from i5 to i33 when the venue was relocated to Stoneleigh Park for i34. From i38 to i42 the event returned to Newbury. The home of i43 to i50 events was The Telford International Centre  and from i51 to i55 it took place at the Ricoh Arena in Coventry. i56 - present day is being held at the NEC in Birmingham due to its growth and popularity. These events have evolved with professional competitive tournaments and large exhibition halls. Popular segments of the festival include main stage shows by special guests, often YouTube personalities, as well as evening entertainment such as the "World Famous Insomnia Pub Quiz". Sometimes referred to as "The Glastonbury of Gaming", Insomnia continues to be the biggest festival of its kind in the UK. The first Insomnia: Insomnia99 was a 300-player event. At that point, it was, and remains, the largest LAN party held in the United Kingdom. It was announced during i55 that the festival would relocate to the NEC in Birmingham in time for i56 in December 2015.

See also
 GameStop
 Gamestation
 CeX
 Christmas Shopper Simulator

References

External links

 

1992 establishments in the United Kingdom
2014 initial public offerings
Companies based in Basingstoke
Companies that have entered administration in the United Kingdom
Golden Joystick Award winners
Retail companies established in 1992
Video game trade shows
Video game retailers in the United Kingdom
Retail companies of the United Kingdom
2019 mergers and acquisitions